Retreat, Wisconsin is an unincorporated community in Vernon County, Wisconsin in the town of Sterling.

Notable people
Francis A. Wallar, Medal of Honor

Notes

External links
Retreat, Wisconsin and the Battle of Bad Axe

Unincorporated communities in Wisconsin
Unincorporated communities in Vernon County, Wisconsin